'
Phulera Junction railway station is a main railway station in Jaipur district, Rajasthan. Its code is FL. It serves Phulera town. The station consists of 5 platforms. The station lies on Jaipur–Ahmedabad main line which connects Jaipur to Ajmer and Ahmedabad as well as Merta Road–Rewari line which connects Jodhpur to Jaipur and Delhi. 111 trains pass through the station and 5 of the originates form the station. It also houses the YDM-4 Locomotives that serve the Mavli-Marwar Metre Gauge Line

Major trains

Some of the important trains that runs from Phulera Junction are:

 Ala Hazrat Express (via Bhildi)
 Anuvrat AC Superfast Express
 Ala Hazrat Express (via Ahmedabad)
 Bandra Terminus–Delhi Sarai Rohilla Express (via Reengus)
 Bandra Terminus–Chandigarh Bi-weekly Superfast Express (via Reengus)
 Ajmer–Chandigarh Garib Rath Express
 Shri Mata Vaishno Devi Katra–Ahmedabad Express (via Jaipur)
 Bhopal–Jaipur Express
 Indore–Jaipur Superfast Express
 Ajmer–Delhi Sarai Rohilla Jan Shatabdi Express
 Jodhpur–Jaipur Intercity Express (via Merta Road)
 Chetak Express
 Pooja Superfast Express (via Jaipur)
 Udaipur–Jaipur Special Superfast Express (via Ajamer)
 Phulera–Rewari Passenger (via Reengus)
 Phulera-Jaipur Passenger
 Jaipur–Ahmedabad Fast Passenger (via Ajmer)
 Jaipur–Bikaner Fast Passenger (via Merta Road)
 Phulera–Kota Passenger (via Jaipur, Swaimadopur)
 Leelan Superfast Bikaner Express (via Merta Road)
 Ajmer–Agra Fort Superfast Express (via Jaipur Road)

References

Railway stations in Jaipur district
Jaipur railway division
Railway junction stations in Rajasthan